Krasnoarmeysky District is the name of several administrative and municipal divisions in Russia.  The districts are generally named for the Red Army.

Districts of the federal subjects

Krasnoarmeysky District, Chelyabinsk Oblast, an administrative and municipal district of Chelyabinsk Oblast
Krasnoarmeysky District, Chuvash Republic, an administrative and municipal district of the Chuvash Republic
Krasnoarmeysky District, Krasnodar Krai, an administrative and municipal district of Krasnodar Krai
Krasnoarmeysky District, Primorsky Krai, an administrative and municipal district of Primorsky Krai
Krasnoarmeysky District, Samara Oblast, an administrative and municipal district of Samara Oblast
Krasnoarmeysky District, Saratov Oblast, an administrative and municipal district of Saratov Oblast

City divisions

Krasnoarmeysky City District, a city district of Volgograd, the administrative center of Volgograd Oblast

See also
Krasnoarmeysky (disambiguation)
Krasnoarmeysk (disambiguation)

References